Ramadan (also Romanized as Ramadān) is a village in Tuskacheshmeh Rural District, in the Central District of Galugah County, Mazandaran Province, Iran. At the 2006 census, its population was 273, in 78 families.

References 

Populated places in Galugah County